Hubert Louis Lee (February 2, 1915 – November 5, 1982) was a soldier in the United States Army during the Korean War. He received the Medal of Honor for his actions on February 1, 1951.

He was born in Arburg, Missouri, and moved to Little Rock, Arkansas, with his family, as a boy. He lived in Leland, Mississippi, until his death and was married later in life. 

Lee joined the Army in May 1939. After World War II he repaired radio and electronic equipment, a trade he had been taught and learned on the GI Bill. He is buried in the Stoneville Cemetery . The Stoneville Cemetery is located on Old Leland Road, between Leland and Greenville, MS.

Medal of Honor citation
Rank and organization: Master Sergeant, U.S. Army, Company I, 23rd Infantry Regiment, 2nd Infantry Division

Place and date: Near Ip-ori, Korea, February 1, 1951

Entered service at: Leland, Miss. Born: February 2, 1915, Arburg, Mo.

G.O. No.: 21, February 5, 1952.

Citation:

'M/Sgt. Lee, a member of Company I, distinguished himself by conspicuous gallantry and intrepidity above and beyond the call of duty in action against the enemy. When his platoon was forced from its position by a numerically superior enemy force, and his platoon leader wounded, M/Sgt. Lee assumed command, regrouped the remnants of his unit, and led them in repeated assaults to regain the position. Within 25 yards of his objective he received a leg wound from grenade fragments, but refused assistance and continued the attack. Although forced to withdraw 5 times, each time he regrouped his remaining men and renewed the assault. Moving forward at the head of his small group in the fifth attempt, he was struck by an exploding grenade, knocked to the ground, and seriously wounded in both legs. Still refusing assistance, he advanced by crawling, rising to his knees to fire, and urging his men to follow. While thus directing the final assault he was wounded a third time, by small-arms fire. Persistently continuing to crawl forward, he directed his men in a final and successful attack which regained the vital objective. His intrepid leadership and determination led to the destruction of 83 of the enemy and withdrawal of the remainder, and was a vital factor in stopping the enemy attack. M/Sgt. Lee's indomitable courage, consummate valor, and outstanding leadership reflect the highest credit upon himself and are in keeping with the finest traditions of the infantry and the U.S. Army.

See also

List of Medal of Honor recipients
List of Korean War Medal of Honor recipients

Notes

References

1915 births
1982 deaths
United States Army Medal of Honor recipients
Korean War recipients of the Medal of Honor
United States Army personnel of the Korean War
Recipients of the Silver Star
People from Missouri